Calonectria morganii is a species of fungus in the family Nectriaceae.

References

Nectriaceae
Fungi described in 1993